The zygomatic nerve is a branch of the maxillary nerve, itself a branch of the trigeminal nerve (CN V). It travels through the orbit and divides into the zygomaticotemporal and the zygomaticofacial nerve. It provides sensory supply to skin over the zygomatic bone and the temporal bone. It also carries postganglionic parasympathetic axons to the lacrimal gland. It may be blocked by anaesthetising the maxillary nerve.

Structure 
The zygomatic nerve is a branch of the maxillary nerve (CN V2), itself a branch of the trigeminal nerve (CN V). It branches at the pterygopalatine ganglion. It travels from the pterygopalatine fossa through the inferior orbital fissure to enter the orbit. In the orbit, it travels anteriorly along the lateral wall.

Branches 
Soon after the zygomatic nerve enters the orbit it divides into its branches. These include:
 the zygomaticotemporal nerve. This passes through the zygomaticotemporal foramen in the zygomatic bone.
 the zygomaticofacial nerve. This passes through the zygomaticofacial foramen in the zygomatic bone.
It also gives off a communicating branch to the lacrimal nerve.

Variation 
Sometimes, the zygomatic nerve does not branch within the orbit. Instead, it enters a single foramen in the zygomatic bone called the zygomatico-orbital foramen. In this case, it divides within the bone into the zygomaticotemporal nerve and the zygomaticofacial nerve.

Function 
The terminal branches of the zygomatic nerve contain sensory axons. These provide sensation to the skin over the temporal bone and the zygomatic bone.  

The zygomatic nerve also carries postganglionic parasympathetic axons. These axons have their cell bodies in the pterygopalatine ganglion. They travel from the ganglion to the zygomatic nerve, and then to the lacrimal nerve through a communicating branch. From the lacrimal nerve, they enter the lacrimal gland and provide secretomotor supply.

Clinical significance 
The zygomatic nerve can be blocked indirectly by anaesthetising the maxillary nerve (CN V2). The zygomatic nerve and its branches may be damaged by a fracture to the zygomatic bone.

Additional images

References 

Maxillary nerve